Głęboka may refer to the following places in Poland:
Głęboka, Strzelin County in Lower Silesian Voivodeship (south-west Poland)
Głęboka, Ząbkowice Śląskie County in Lower Silesian Voivodeship (south-west Poland)
Głęboka, Gorlice County in Lesser Poland Voivodeship (south Poland)
Głęboka, Kraków County in Lesser Poland Voivodeship (south Poland)
Głęboka, Masovian Voivodeship (east-central Poland)
Głęboka, Lubusz Voivodeship (west Poland)